USS Munplace (ID-2346) was a cargo ship that served in the United States Navy from 1918 to 1919.

SS Munplace was built as a commercial cargo ship by the Maryland Steel Company at Sparrows Point, Maryland, in 1916, for the Munson Steamship Line. She was delivered to Munson on 9 May 1916 and entered mercantile service. The U.S. Navy acquired Munplace from Munson for World War I service on 31 August 1918, assigned her the naval registry Identification Number (Id. No.) 2346, and commissioned her as USS Munplace at Newport News, Virginia, the same day.

Assigned to the Naval Overseas Transportation Service (NOTS), Munplace was loaded with a cargo of United States Army supplies, made a transatlantic crossing to France in convoy, and arrived at Rochefort, France, on 4 October 1918. Proceeding to La Pallice, France, she discharged her cargo, went on to Le Verdon-sur-Mer, France, and returned to the United States, arriving at Norfolk, Virginia, on 10 November 1918. World War I ended the next day.

In December 1918, Munplace departed Norfolk and delivered another U.S. Army cargo to La Pallice. She then returned to the United States, arriving at Newport News in January 1919

On 15 February 1919 Munplace was decommissioned and delivered to the United States Shipping Board for simultaneous return to Munson Steamship Line. She returned to mercantile service as SS Munplace, remaining in commercial use until she was scrapped at Baltimore, Maryland, in 1939.

References

Department of the Navy, Naval Historical Center: Online Library of Selected Images: Civilian Ships: S.S. Munplace (American Freighter, 1916) Served as USS Munplace (ID # 2346) in 1918-1919.
NavSource Online NavSource Online: Section Patrol Craft Photo Archive Munplace (ID 2346)

World War I cargo ships of the United States
Ships built in Sparrows Point, Maryland
1916 ships
Cargo ships of the United States Navy